"A Little in Love" may refer to: 

"A Little in Love" (Cliff Richard song), 1981 song by Cliff Richard
"A Little in Love" (Paul Brandt song), 1997 song by Paul Brandt
"A Little in Love", 2021 song by Todrick Hall from Haus Party, Pt. 3